William Cameron McCool (September 23, 1961 – February 1, 2003) was an American naval officer and aviator, test pilot, aeronautical engineer, and NASA astronaut, who was the pilot of Space Shuttle Columbia mission STS-107. He and the rest of the crew of STS-107 were killed when Columbia disintegrated during reentry into the atmosphere. He was the crew's youngest male member. He was posthumously awarded the Congressional Space Medal of Honor.

Personal information 
McCool was born September 23, 1961, in San Diego, California. His parents divorced when he was young and his mother married Barent McCool, a Naval aviator. McCool was active in the Boy Scouts of America where he became an Eagle Scout. His favorite song was "Imagine" by John Lennon, which was played during the STS-107 mission. His favorite band was Radiohead, and the song "Fake Plastic Trees" was played by Mission Control as a wake-up call.
 
McCool died on February 1, 2003, when Space Shuttle Columbia broke up over the southern United States during reentry. He was survived by his wife, Lani, and their three sons. He is buried in Anacortes, Washington, where he lived at the time of his death.

Education 

 1976–77: Attended John F. Kennedy High School, Tamuning, Guam
 1979: Graduated from Coronado High School, Lubbock, Texas.
 1983: Received a Bachelor of Science degree in Applied Science from the United States Naval Academy.
 1985: Received a Master of Science degree in Computer Science from the University of Maryland, College Park.
 1991: Graduated from United States Naval Test Pilot School, Naval Air Station Patuxent River - Class 101.
 1992: Received a Master of Science degree in Aeronautical Engineering from the U.S. Naval Postgraduate School.

Flight experience 

McCool completed flight training and was designated a Naval Aviator in August 1986. He was assigned to Tactical Electronic Warfare Squadron 129 (VAQ-129) at NAS Whidbey Island, Washington, for initial EA-6B Prowler training. His first operational tour was with Tactical Electronic Warfare Squadron 133 (VAQ-133), where he made two deployments aboard the aircraft carrier  to the Mediterranean Sea, and received designation as a wing-qualified Landing Signal Officer (LSO). In November 1989, he was selected for the U.S. Naval Postgraduate School/Test Pilot School (TPS) Cooperative Education Program.

After graduating from TPS in June 1992, he worked as a TA-4J and EA-6B test pilot in Flight Systems Department of Strike Aircraft Test Directorate at NAS Patuxent River, Maryland. He was responsible for the management and conduct of a wide variety of projects, ranging from airframe fatigue life studies to numerous avionics upgrades. His primary efforts, however, were dedicated to flight test of the Advanced Capability (ADVCAP) EA-6B. Following his Patuxent River tour, McCool returned to Whidbey Island, and was assigned to Tactical Electronic Warfare Squadron 132 (VAQ-132) aboard the carrier . He served as Administrative and Operations Officer with the squadron through their work-up cycle, receiving notice of his NASA selection while embarked on Enterprise for her final pre-deployment at sea period.

McCool accumulated over 2,800 hours flight experience in 24 aircraft and over 400 carrier arrestments.

NASA experience 

Selected by NASA in April 1996, McCool reported to the Johnson Space Center in August 1996. He completed two years of training and evaluation, and was qualified for flight assignment as a pilot. Initially assigned to the Computer Support Branch, McCool also served as technical assistant to the director of flight crew operations, and worked Shuttle cockpit upgrade issues for the Astronaut Office.

Spaceflight experience 

McCool was pilot of Space Shuttle mission STS-107, January 16 to February 1, 2003, logging 15 days, 22 hours and 20 minutes in space. The 16-day flight was a dedicated science and research mission. Working 24 hours a day, in two alternating shifts, the crew successfully conducted approximately 80 experiments. According to NASA, McCool said of the unique view he and his crewmates had from Columbia:

STS-107's mission ended abruptly on February 1, 2003, when Columbia disintegrated during re-entry, 16 minutes before scheduled landing. All seven crew members were killed. 

McCool was posthumously awarded the NASA Space Flight Medal, the NASA Distinguished Service Medal, the Defense Distinguished Service Medal (DDSM), and the Congressional Space Medal of Honor.

Organizations 

 U.S. Naval Academy Alumni Association

Special honors 

 Eagle Scout
 Served as team captain of the U.S. Naval Academy Cross Country team his senior year
 Graduated second of 1,083 in the Class of 1983 at the U.S. Naval Academy
 Presented "Outstanding Student" and "Best DT-II Thesis" awards as graduate of U.S. Naval Test Pilot School, Class 101
 Awarded Navy Commendation Medal (2)
 Awarded Navy Achievement Medal (2)

Tributes 

 Asteroid 51829 Williemccool was posthumously named for McCool.
 Lunar crater McCool is named after him.
 McCool Hill in the Columbia Hills on Mars was posthumously named for McCool.
 McCool Hall, in the Columbia Village apartments at the Florida Institute of Technology, is named after him.
 Guam South Elementary/Middle School, a DoDEA school in Santa Rita, Guam, was renamed CDR William C. McCool Elementary/Middle School on August 29, 2003.
 Willie McCool Track and Field at Coronado High School in Lubbock, Texas, was posthumously named for McCool.
 Willie McCool Memorial with Bronze Sculpture was dedicated on Saturday, May 7, 2005, at Huneke Park at 82nd and Quaker Avenue in Lubbock, Texas.
Commander William C. McCool Academy, opened in the fall of 2020, is a STEM middle school in Lubbock Texas
 The William McCool Science Center, located on the campus of the Frank Lamping Elementary School in Henderson, Nevada, is a facility where elementary students throughout the Clark County School District have an opportunity to learn about space and other fields of science.
 A Gawad Kalinga village in Moncada, Tarlac, Philippines, will be named "USN Commander Willie McCool GK Village".
 In the Star Trek book Mirror Universe – Glass Empires, the shuttlecraft of the U.S.S. Defiant in the short story "Age of the Empress" is named the McCool.
 McCool Track at the Naval Academy Preparatory School, Naval Station Newport, Rhode Island is named after him.
The spacefaring game Elite: Dangerous contains a starport in the Jaroua system named "McCool City".
 The Willie McCool Monument was dedicated on December 2, 2007, at the U.S. Naval Academy Golf Course. The monument stands where Willie would have been 16 minutes from the finish line during his fastest race on Navy's home course.
 The Willie McCool Memorial Model Air Field park located in North Las Vegas, Nevada was posthumously named for McCool on October 23, 2004.
 McCool Hall, located on Tinker AFB, Oklahoma is a Navy Bachelors Enlisted Quarters named after McCool.
 Camp McCool, located in Bagram Airfield, was the home of rotating EA-6B Prowler Squadrons supporting ISAF in Afghanistan.
 The FAA named a Fix/Waypoint MCCUL near Naval Air Station Whidbey Island (also near Anacortes, WA) located at 48 13.11N, 123 07.03W. Navy pilots are routinely vectored to the McCool waypoint.
 The McCool Breakthrough Award is named after Willie McCool and is given to an individual who has made a significant breakthrough in the spirit of ICHRIE's mission.
 The Commander William C. McCool Academy is Lubbock ISD’s newest magnet middle school.

See also 

 List of Eagle Scouts
 List of spaceflight-related accidents and incidents
 Space Shuttle Columbia disaster

References

External links 

 Astronautix biography of William C. McCool
 Spacefacts biography of William C. McCool
 William C. McCool at Astronauts Memorial page
 

1961 births
2003 deaths
Space Shuttle Columbia disaster
United States Navy astronauts
People from San Diego
People from Lubbock, Texas
People from Anacortes, Washington
Coronado High School (Lubbock, Texas) alumni
United States Naval Academy alumni
University of Maryland, College Park alumni
Naval Postgraduate School alumni
United States Naval Test Pilot School alumni
United States Navy officers
United States Naval Aviators
American test pilots
Aviators from California
American aerospace engineers
Aviators killed in aviation accidents or incidents in the United States
Accidental deaths in Texas
Burials at the United States Naval Academy Cemetery
Recipients of the Congressional Space Medal of Honor
Recipients of the NASA Distinguished Service Medal
Recipients of the Defense Distinguished Service Medal
Space Shuttle program astronauts